Viscum is a genus of about 70–100 species of mistletoes, native to temperate and tropical regions of Europe, Africa, Asia and Australasia. Traditionally, the genus has been placed in its own family Viscaceae, but recent genetic research by the Angiosperm Phylogeny Group shows this family to be correctly placed within a larger circumscription of the sandalwood family, Santalaceae. Its name is the origin of the English word viscous, after the Latin viscum, a sticky bird lime made from the plants' berries.

Their hosts are woody shrubs and trees. The foliage is dichotomously or verticillately branching, with opposite pairs or whorls of green leaves which perform some photosynthesis (minimal in some species, notably V. nudum), but with the plant drawing its mineral and water needs from the host tree. Different species of Viscum tend to use different host species; most species are able to use several different host species.

The flowers are inconspicuous, greenish-yellow,  diameter. The fruit is a berry, white, yellow, orange, or red when mature, containing one or more seeds embedded in very sticky juice; the seeds are dispersed when birds (notably the mistle thrush) eat the fruit, and remove the sticky seeds from the bill by wiping them on tree branches where they can germinate.

Toxicity in the genus Viscum
Viscum species are poisonous to humans; eating the fruit causes a weak pulse and acute gastrointestinal problems including stomach pain and diarrhea.  At least one of the active ingredients is the lectin viscumin, which is intensely toxic. It inhibits protein synthesis by catalytically inactivating ribosomes. In spite of this, many species of animals are adapted to eating the fruit as a significant part of their diet.

Fossil record
†Viscum morlotii from the early Miocene, has been described from fossil leaf compressions that have been found in the Kristina Mine at Hrádek nad Nisou in North Bohemia, the Czech Republic.

Selected species

 Viscum album – European mistletoe
 Viscum articulatum
 Viscum bancroftii
 Viscum capense – Cape mistletoe (South Africa)
 Viscum coloratum – Korean mistletoe (Korea)
 Viscum combreticola Engl. – combretum mistletoe
 Viscum cruciatum – red-berried mistletoe 
 Viscum diospyrosicola
 Viscum exile
 Viscum fargesii
 Viscum liquidambaricola
 Viscum loranthi
 Viscum minimum
 Viscum monoicum
 Viscum multinerve
 Viscum nudum
 Viscum orientale
 Viscum ovalifolium
 Viscum rotundifolium L.f. – round-leaved or red-berry mistletoe
 Viscum scurruloideum
 Viscum triflorum
 Viscum whitei
 Viscum yunnanense

References

Flora of China: Viscum
Flora of Pakistan: Viscum
Flora Europaea: Viscum

Mistletoe Pages: Viscum

 
Parasitic plants
Santalales genera